The year 1999 is the seventh year in the history of Pancrase, a mixed martial arts promotion based in Japan. In 1999 Pancrase held 14 events beginning with Pancrase: Breakthrough 1.

Title fights

Events list

Pancrase: Breakthrough 1

Pancrase: Breakthrough 1 was an event held on January 19, 1999, at Korakuen Hall in Tokyo, Japan.

Results

Pancrase: Breakthrough 2

Pancrase: Breakthrough 2 was an event held on February 11, 1999, at Umeda Stella Hall in Osaka, Osaka, Japan.

Results

Pancrase: Breakthrough 3

Pancrase: Breakthrough 3 was an event held on March 9, 1999, at Korakuen Hall in Tokyo, Japan.

Results

Pancrase: Breakthrough 4

Pancrase: Breakthrough 4 was an event held on April 18, 1999, at the Yokohama Cultural Gymnasium in Yokohama, Kanagawa, Japan.

Results

Pancrase: Breakthrough 5

Pancrase: Breakthrough 5 was an event held on May 23, 1999, at Chikusa Sport Center in Nagoya, Aichi, Japan.

Results

Pancrase: Breakthrough 6

Pancrase: Breakthrough 6 was an event held on June 11, 1999, at Korakuen Hall in Tokyo, Japan.

Results

Pancrase: Breakthrough 7

Pancrase: Breakthrough 7 was an event held on July 6, 1999, at Korakuen Hall in Tokyo, Japan.

Results

Pancrase: 1999 Neo-Blood Tournament Opening Round

Pancrase: 1999 Neo-Blood Tournament Opening Round was an event held on August 1, 1999, at Korakuen Hall in Tokyo, Japan.

Results

Pancrase: 1999 Neo-Blood Tournament Second Round

Pancrase: 1999 Neo-Blood Tournament Second Round was an event held on August 1, 1999, at Korakuen Hall in Tokyo, Japan.

Results

Pancrase: Breakthrough 8

Pancrase: Breakthrough 8 was an event held on September 4, 1999, at the Sendai Spring General Gymnasium in Sendai, Miyagi, Japan.

Results

Pancrase: 1999 Anniversary Show

Pancrase: 1999 Anniversary Show was an event held on September 18, 1999, at the Tokyo Bay NK Hall in Urayasu, Chiba, Japan.

Results

Pancrase: Breakthrough 9

Pancrase: Breakthrough 9 was an event held on October 25, 1999, at Korakuen Hall in Tokyo, Japan.

Results

Pancrase: Breakthrough 10

Pancrase: Breakthrough 10 was an event held on November 28, 1999, at the Namihaya Dome in Kadoma, Osaka, Japan.

Results

Pancrase: Breakthrough 11

Pancrase: Breakthrough 11 was an event held on December 18, 1999, at the Yokohama Cultural Gymnasium in Yokohama, Kanagawa, Japan.

Results

See also 
 Pancrase
 List of Pancrase champions
 List of Pancrase events

References

Pancrase events
1999 in mixed martial arts